Megher Onek Rong is a Bangladeshi Bengali film directed by Harunur Rashid based on Bangladesh Liberation war.
This film got National Film Awards in five categories including Best Film, Best Director, Best Child Artist, Best Music Director, and Best Cinematography.

Plot
This film portraits rape scenes during the liberation and committing suicide of the victims. Is also shows the adopting of war children to their new mother after the death of his?her mother committed suicide.

Cast
 Mathin
 Omor Elahi
 Rawshan Ara
 Adnan

Soundtrack
The music and background score was directed by Ferdausi Rahman.

Response 
Film critic Ahmed Muztaba Zamal, writing in Cinemaya in 2000, named Megher Onek Rong as one of the top twelve films from Bangladesh.

Awards

References

External links
 

Bengali-language Bangladeshi films
1976 films
Best Film National Film Award (Bangladesh) winners
Films scored by Ferdousi Rahman
1970s Bengali-language films
Films based on the Bangladesh Liberation War